The 12th César Awards ceremony, presented by the Académie des Arts et Techniques du Cinéma, honoured the best French films of 1986 and took place on 7 March 1987 at the Palais des Congrès in Paris. The ceremony was chaired by Sean Connery and hosted by Michel Drucker and Pierre Tchernia. Thérèse won the award for Best Film.

Winners and nominees
The winners are highlighted in bold:

Best Film:Thérèse, directed by Alain Cavalier37°2 le matin, directed by Jean-Jacques BeineixJean de Florette, directed by Claude BerriMélo, directed by Alain ResnaisTenue de soirée, directed by Bertrand Blier
Best Foreign Film:Der Name der Rose, directed by Jean-Jacques AnnaudAfter Hours, directed by Martin ScorseseHannah and Her Sisters, directed by Woody AllenThe Mission, directed by Roland JofféOut of Africa, directed by Sydney Pollack 
Best First Work:La Femme de ma vie, directed by Régis WargnierBlack Mic Mac, directed by Thomas GilouJe hais les acteurs, directed by Gérard KrawczykNoir et blanc, directed by Claire Devers 
Best Actor:Daniel Auteuil, for Jean de FloretteJean-Hugues Anglade, for 37°2 le matinChristophe Malavoy, for La Femme de ma vieAndré Dussollier, for MéloMichel Blanc, for Tenue de soirée
Best Actress:Sabine Azéma, for Mélo Béatrice Dalle, for 37°2 le matinJane Birkin, for La Femme de ma vieJuliette Binoche, for Mauvais sangMiou-Miou, for Tenue de soirée
Best Supporting Actor:Pierre Arditi, for MéloGérard Darmon, for 37°2 le matinJean-Louis Trintignant, for La Femme de ma vieJean Carmet, for Les FugitifsClaude Piéplu, for Le Paltoquet 
Best Supporting Actress:Emmanuelle Béart, for Manon des sourcesClémentine Célarié, for 37°2 le matinMarie Dubois, for Descente aux enfersDanielle Darrieux, for Le Lieu du crimeJeanne Moreau, for Le Paltoquet
Most Promising Actor:Isaach De Bankolé, for Black Mic MacRémi Martin, for Conseil de familleJean-Philippe Écoffey, for Gardien de la nuitCris Campion, for Pirates
Most Promising Actress:Catherine Mouchet, for ThérèseDominique Blanc, for La Femme de ma vieJulie Delpy, for Mauvais sangMarianne Basler, for Rosa la rose, fille publique
Best Director:Alain Cavalier, for ThérèseJean-Jacques Beineix, for 37°2 le matinClaude Berri, for Jean de FloretteAlain Resnais, for MéloBertrand Blier, for Tenue de soirée  
Best Writing:Alain Cavalier, Camille de Casabianca, for ThérèseFrancis Veber, for Les Fugitifs Claude Berri, Gérard Brach, for Jean de FloretteBertrand Blier, for Tenue de soirée 
Best Cinematography:Philippe Rousselot, for ThérèseBruno Nuytten, for Jean de FloretteJean-Yves Escoffier, for Mauvais sangCharles Van Damme, for Mélo
Best Costume Design:Anthony Powell, for PiratesCatherine Leterrier, for MéloYvette Bonnay, for Thérèse  
Best Sound:Bernard Leroux, Claude Villand, Michel Desrois, William Flageollet, for 'Round MidnightPierre Gamet, Laurent Quaglio, Dominique Hennequin, for Jean de FloretteDominique Hennequin, Bernard Bats, for Tenue de soiréeAlain Lachassagne, Dominique Dalmasso, for Thérèse
Best Editing:Isabelle Dedieu, for ThérèseArmand Psenny, for Round MidnightMonique Prim, for 37°2 le matinClaudine Merlin, for Tenue de soirée 
Best Music:Herbie Hancock, for 'Round MidnightGabriel Yared, for 37°2 le matinJean-Claude Petit, for Jean de FloretteSerge Gainsbourg, for Tenue de soirée
Best Production Design:Pierre Guffroy, for PiratesAlexandre Trauner, for 'Round MidnightJacques Saulnier, for MéloBernard Evein, for Thérèse  
Best Fiction Short:La Goula, directed by Roger GuillotAlger la blanche, directed by Cyril CollardLes Arcandiers, directed by Manuel Sanchez Bel ragazzo, directed by Georges Bensoussan Belle de jour, directed by Henri GruvmanBocetta revient de guerre, directed by Jean-Pierre SinapiLe Bridge, directed by Gilles Dagneau
Honorary César:Etablissement cinématographique des ArméesYves Allégret - PosthumouslyJean Gabin - PosthumouslyJean-Luc Godard

See also
 59th Academy Awards
 40th British Academy Film Awards

References

External links
 Official website
 
 12th César Awards at AlloCiné

1987
1987 film awards
Cesar